Donald Joseph Craft (born November 19, 1959) is a former American football running back who played three seasons with the Houston Oilers of the National Football League (NFL). He was drafted by the Oilers in the twelfth round of the 1982 NFL Draft. He played college football at the University of Louisville and attended A. Crawford Mosley High School in Lynn Haven, Florida.

Craft also played for the Hamilton Tiger-Cats, of the Canadian Football League.

References

External links
Just Sports Stats

Living people
1959 births
Players of American football from Florida
American football running backs
Canadian football running backs
African-American players of American football
African-American players of Canadian football
Louisville Cardinals football players
Houston Oilers players
Hamilton Tiger-Cats players
People from Panama City, Florida
21st-century African-American people
20th-century African-American sportspeople